St. Andrew's Episcopal Church is an historic church located in Hanover, Massachusetts. It was founded in 1725 in what is now known as Norwell, an area that was then part of Scituate). It is one of the oldest parishes in the Episcopal Diocese of Massachusetts.

History
The first meeting of the parish took place on July 28, 1725 at the North Meeting House in Scituate after a group of townspeople invited the Rev. Dr. Timothy Cutler of Christ Church, Boston, to lead a service and preach. Between 1727 and 1731 regular meetings of the parish took place in a private house in Scituate, led by the resident minister of Christ Church, Quincy, the Rev. Ebenezer Miller. On October 11, 1731, Miller led a service to open the first church building in front of a congregation of 150. Several notable figures, such as John Quincy Adams, Daniel Webster, Robert Rantoul, and Horace Mann, were at "a large all-day gathering in the cause of education" in September 1838.

The first resident minister for the parish, the Rev. Addington Davenport, was appointed in 1733. Proceeds from this gift would help fund the purchase of land and building of a rectory in 1849.

On December 24, 1986, the church was destroyed by an electrical fire, but later rebuilt.

On November 6, 2011, the parish celebrated its bicentennial by displaying rare sermons and other artifacts, as well as a piano and organ concert and old church history stories. Today, the church sits on Church Street in the Four Corners village of Hanover, a scenic village that was the starting point of Hanover itself.

References

External links
 

19th-century Episcopal church buildings
Episcopal church buildings in Massachusetts